Future Life, known as Future in its first year, was a science and science fiction magazine published from 1978 to 1981 by O'Quinn Studios. In the first year of its existence, the magazine was called "Future", then the name was expanded to "Future Life". Contributors included Harlan Ellison, Ed Naha, Boris Vallejo, and many others. It covered futuristic topics - largely space travel - as well as current scientific events of the time, and featured reviews of science fiction movies, books and comics, as well as interviews with Arthur C. Clarke, Anne McCaffrey, Ray Bradbury and many other scientists, artists and authors. The magazine was based in New York City.

The 6th issue of the magazine (1978) is known for being one of the first places in which the concept of "longevity escape velocity" was publicly announced.

Issues
Future #1 (April 1978)
Future #2 (May 1978)
Future #3 (July 1978)
Future #4 (August 1978)
Future #5 (October 1978)
Future #6 (November 1978)
Future #7 (January 1979)
Future #8 (February 1979)
Future Life #9 (March 1979)
Future Life #10 (May 1979)
Future Life #11 (July 1979)
Future Life #12 (August 1979)
Future Life #13 (September 1979)
Future Life #14 (November 1979)
Future Life #15 (December 1979)
Future Life #16 (February 1980)
Future Life #17 (March 1980)
Future Life #18 (May 1980)
Future Life #19 (June 1980)
Future Life #20 (August 1980)
Future Life #21 (September 1980)
Future Life #22 (November 1980)
Future Life #23 (December 1980)
Future Life #24 (February 1981)
Future Life #25 (March 1981)
Future Life #26 (May 1981)
Future Life #27 (June 1981)
Future Life #28 (August 1981)
Future Life #29 (September 1981)
Future Life #30 (November 1981)
Future Life #31 (December 1981) - final issue

Notable contributors

Chesley Bonestell
Kerry O'Quinn
Neil Armstrong
Harlan Ellison
Ed Naha
Jesco von Puttkamer
Rick Baker
Ron Miller
Charles Bogle
Joseph Kay
Isaac Asimov
Frederik Pohl
George Pal
Virginia Heinlein
James Oberg
Malcolm Brenner
Norman Spinrad
Gerard K. O'Neill
Boris Vallejo
Howard Cruse
Ben Bova
Bob McCall
Ursula K. Le Guin
Gerald Morris
Carolyn Meinel
Shusei Nagaoka
David A. Hardy
William F. Nolan
Syd Mead
Michael Dobson
Robert Anton Wilson
Gil Kane
Michael Cassutt
John Berkey
Carol Rosin
Charles Sheffield
Michael Cassutt
Luigi Cozzi
Ted White
Lou Stathis
Ludek Pesek
Jacques Cousteau
Gerard K. O'Neill
Don Davis
Todd Rundgren
G. Harry Stine
Roger Zelazny
John Billingham
Chris Foss
Robert Anton Wilson
Jon Pareles
Brian Aldiss
T. A. Heppenheimer
Jill Bauman
Harry Harrison
Jon Lomberg
Steve Sansweet
Herman Kahn
F. M. Esfandiary

Notable people interviewed

Douglas Trumbull
Arthur C. Clarke
J. Allen Hynek
Larry Niven
William F. Nolan
George Pal
Joanna Russ
Keith Henson
Alvin Toffler
Ray Bradbury
Shusei Nagaoka
Marion Zimmer Bradley
David Gerrold
Joe Haldeman
Steven Spielberg
Anne McCaffrey
Gahan Wilson
Christopher Reeve
John Brunner
A. E. van Vogt
Leslie Stevens
L. Sprague de Camp
Jerry Pournelle
Philip Kaufman
Bjo Trimble
Gregory Benford
Gene Roddenberry
Hal Clement
Timothy Leary
Robert Silverberg
Larry Fast
Vonda McIntyre
John Varley
Robert Jastrow
Theodore Sturgeon

References 

Magazines established in 1978
Magazines disestablished in 1981
Defunct science fiction magazines published in the United States
Magazines published in New York City